U.S. Route 25 (US 25) in the state of Tennessee runs northwest from North Carolina and runs concurrently with US 70 for its entire length until splitting into US 25W and US 25E in Newport.

Route description

The Tennessee section of US 25 begins at the North Carolina state line near Del Rio, concurrent with US 70 and unsigned SR 9. US 25/US 70/SR 9 then goes through some curves and cross the French Broad River via the Wolf Creek Bridge. They then begin running along the north bank of the French Broad and intersect and become concurrent with SR 107 and then enter Del Rio, where SR 107 separates. US 25/US 70/SR 9 continue northwest to intersect SR 340 before leaving Del Rio. They then cross the French Broad again and before entering Newport and leaving The French Broad and crossing the Pigeon River. In Newport, they intersect SR 73 before entering downtown. In downtown, they intersect and become concurrent with US 321 and unsigned SR 35. US 321 separates shortly afterwards at the intersection with SR 32, where US 321 goes south on SR 32 and SR 32 joins the concurrency. US 25/US 70/SR 9/SR 35 then leave downtown and come to where US 25 splits into US 25W and US 25E. Here, SR 32 goes north on US 25E and US 70/SR 9/SR 35 continue on US 25W.

Major intersections

References 

 Tennessee
025
025